Anatoli is a small village in the Ierapetra municipality of the prefecture of Lasithi in eastern Crete. It is built 600 meters above sea level and the view over Ierapetra to the sea  with Chrysi island opposite, is unique. It is called the "Libyan sea balcony". Despite the destruction of the surrounding wooded area, due to fire in recent years, the whole landscape is fantastic.

Ierapetra
Populated places in Lasithi